Treyvon Ramal Hester (born September 21, 1992) is an American football defensive tackle for the Seattle Sea Dragons of the XFL. He played college football at Toledo, and was selected in the seventh round of the 2017 NFL Draft by the Oakland Raiders.

Professional career

Oakland Raiders
Hester was drafted by the Oakland Raiders in the seventh round, 244th overall, in the 2017 NFL Draft. On September 3, 2018, Hester was waived by the Raiders.

Philadelphia Eagles
On September 7, 2018, Hester was signed to the Philadelphia Eagles' practice squad. He was promoted to the active roster on October 2, 2018. On January 6, 2019, during a wild card game against the Chicago Bears, he tipped a potential game-winning 43-yard field goal by Cody Parkey, a play now infamously known as the Double Doink, to help the Eagles win 16–15. Hester was waived during final roster cuts on August 31, 2019.

Washington Redskins
Hester signed with the Washington Redskins on September 2, 2019.

Green Bay Packers
Hester signed with the Green Bay Packers on May 1, 2020. He was placed on the COVID-19 reserve list by the team on July 30, 2020, and was activated on August 17, 2020. He was waived/injured on September 5, 2020, and subsequently placed on injured reserve the next day. He was waived with an injury settlement on September 10.

Philadelphia Eagles (second stint)
On November 9, 2020, the Eagles signed Hester to the practice squad. He signed a reserve/future contract with the Eagles on January 4, 2021, and was released on March 9, 2021.

Buffalo Bills
On May 20, 2021, the Buffalo Bills signed Hester to a contract after a successful tryout. On August 27, 2021, he was placed on injured reserve. He was released with an injury settlement on September 8, 2021.

Carolina Panthers
On November 3, 2021, Hester was signed to the Carolina Panthers practice squad. He was released on November 16.

NFL career statistics

References

External links

Toledo Rockets bio

1992 births
Living people
Players of American football from Pittsburgh
American football defensive tackles
Toledo Rockets football players
Oakland Raiders players
Philadelphia Eagles players
Washington Redskins players
Green Bay Packers players
Buffalo Bills players
Carolina Panthers players
Seattle Sea Dragons players